Laminacauda sacra is a species of sheet weaver found in Bolivia. It was described by Millidge in 1991.

References

Linyphiidae
Fauna of Bolivia
Spiders of South America
Spiders described in 1991